Techron is a patented fuel additive developed by Chevron Corporation and sold in its fuel operations (including Texaco and Caltex). It contains a polyether amine-based detergent, which is purported to dissolve deposits in automotive engines and prevent them from building up. Chevron released Techron as an additive in 1981, and began including it in all of their gasoline products in 1995. It is still available as a concentrate today. 

The Chevron Cars debuted in 1995 and were used to advertise the additive.

Components 
Techron consists of five components:
 Distillates, hydrotreated light at 40-70% weight
 Stoddard solvent at 15-40% weight
 Solvent naphtha (petroleum), light aromatic at 5-10% weight
 1,2,4-trimethylbenzene at 1-5% weight
 Polyetheramine (PEA) (detergent), polyether amines at 20-49% weight

Predecessor 
"Techroline" was the predecessor to Techron. The company claimed it could control combustion-chamber deposits in cars, as well as keep their fuel-intake systems clean.

See also 
 List of automotive fuel brands

References

External links 
 
 Motor Gasolines Technical Review on Chevron website (2009)
 Chevron Unveils New Gasolines With "Techron" at Chevron Press Release Archives (15 May 1995)
 Chevron Techron® Concentrate Plus Fuel System Cleaner on Chevron website (archived 17 Oct 2006)

Products introduced in 1981
Products introduced in 1995
1981 establishments in the United States
Petroleum products
Polyethers
Amines
Chevron Corporation brands
Texaco
Fuel additives